Roberto Andrés Cairo Pablo (3 May 1963 – 28 August 2014) was a Spanish film and television actor. He appeared in various television series and films mostly as supporting actor, most notably as Desi in the TV series Cuéntame cómo pasó. He died on 28 August 2014 due to lung cancer.

References

External links

1963 births
2014 deaths
Male actors from Madrid
Spanish male film actors
Spanish male television actors
20th-century Spanish male actors
21st-century Spanish male actors
Deaths from cancer in Spain